Sound Shapes is a 2012 video game designed by Jessica Mak and Shaw-Han Liem and developed by Queasy Games for PlayStation 3, PlayStation 4, and PlayStation Vita. The game is a side-scrolling platform game with a musical focus. The game also features the ability to create levels and share levels with other users. The Vita version of the game features use of the touch screen and back touch pad to place sounds of different musical instruments during creation of levels.
Sound Shapes was shown at industry conference E3 in 2011 and picked up nominations for best of show award from media sites including IGN, 1UP, and Electric Playground. It also received 2 Game Critics Awards (Best Mobile and Best Casual).

At the Spike Video Game Awards 2011, it was announced that Deadmau5 would be contributing songs and sound material to the project.

Beck has contributed 3 new songs to the game: "Cities", "Touch the People", and "Spiral Staircase". These are still exclusive to the game as of 2017, despite fan desire to see them released digitally.

It was included on the "Best of PlayStation Network Vol. 1" compilation disc, released 18 June 2013.

Development 

Mak and Liem wanted to develop a game that could give beginners a sense of joyful creation, without the need for harmonic training or complicated music theory. They prototyped their idea for about a year before settling on the coin-collecting musical mechanics that the final game has. To cater to the 'hardcore platformer' player base, Death Mode was introduced. It was important to marry the sound with the style, so each album was a close collaboration between a musician and a visual artist. In some cases levels began with a song, in other cases a style, and evolved naturally from there.

Downloadable Content 

At launch Sound Shapes had various downloadable content (DLC) available.

The first round of DLC was released on 4 December 2012, having three sound packs and a curved terrain pack. It introduces five new instruments and Beat School levels.

The second round of DLC was released on 12 March 2013, having more milkcrate free updates and a Car Mini-Album Creator pack. It also introduced a much requested feature of offline play.

On 14 May 2013, two new sound packs were released. One being an 80s sound pack, adding synth features, and the other DLC being a dubstep sound pack featuring new Beat School features.

On 28 May 2013, five new Milkcrate albums were released as a free update.

Online Server Shutdown 
On 15 October 2018, The server for Sound Shapes was shut down, meaning that people who played past that point were no longer able to access any online-related info. This included Community-made levels and uploading levels to the Community. This accounted for every console the game was released on PS4, PS3, and PS Vita.

Reception 

Sound Shapes was selected for Best Handheld Game in the 2012 Spike Video Game Awards. Sound Shapes also won for Best Song in a Game for "Cities" by Beck.

The game has also proven popular among Vita gamers due to its relatively simple and enjoyable Platinum Trophy. This is an award for attaining 100% of the trophies in a video game. The platinum is perceived as attainable and short, and has been featured on multiple websites because of this.

References

2012 video games
Music video games
Platform games
PlayStation Vita games
PlayStation 3 games
PlayStation 4 games
PlayStation Network games
Video games developed in Canada
Video games with user-generated gameplay content
Spike Video Game Award winners